Joaquina Navarrete Contreras (born 3 August 1966) is a Mexican politician affiliated with the PRD. She currently serves as Deputy of the LXII Legislature of the Mexican Congress representing the State of Mexico.

References

1966 births
Living people
Politicians from the State of Mexico
Women members of the Chamber of Deputies (Mexico)
Party of the Democratic Revolution politicians
21st-century Mexican politicians
21st-century Mexican women politicians
Members of the Chamber of Deputies (Mexico) for the State of Mexico